USS Metomkin (AG-136/AKL-7) was a Camano-class cargo ship constructed for the U.S. Army as USA FS-316 shortly before the end of  World War II and later acquired by the U.S. Navy in 1947. She was configured as a transport and cargo ship and was assigned to serve the World War II Trust Territories in the Pacific Ocean.

Constructed in Camden, New Jersey
The first ship to be so named by the Navy, Metomkin (AG 136) was built by John A. Mathis Co., Camden, New Jersey, in 1944; operated by the Army as a freight supply ship in the Pacific Ocean during and after World War II; acquired by the Navy as FS-316 at Subic Bay, Luzon, 28 February 1947; renamed Metomkin 3 April 1947; and commissioned at Apra Harbor, Guam, 16 August 1947.

Pacific islands operations
Following completion of conversion for Navy use, Metomkin began passenger and cargo shuttle duty in the central and western Pacific. Assigned to the Service Force, Pacific Fleet, she made runs to American bases in the Mariana Islands, the Marshall Islands, and the Caroline Islands.

Operating out of Apra Harbor, she completed numerous runs from the Palau Islands eastward to Pearl Harbor, and during the next 4 years she maintained a busy schedule while transporting military and civilian passengers as well as tons of general cargo. On 31 March 1949 she reclassified as AKL-7.
 
Metomkin continued her important logistics support duty to military bases in the Pacific until 22 June 1951 when she completed her final run from the Carolines.

Transfer to Department of Interior
She decommissioned at Guam 3 August 1951 and was transferred the same day to the U.S. Department of Interior. Her name was struck from the Navy List 16 January 1952. Her subsequent fate is not known.

References
 
 NavSource Online: Service Ship Photo Archive - FS-316 - AG-136 / AKL-7 Metomkin

 

Ships of the United States Army
Design 381 coastal freighters
Ships built by John H. Mathis & Company
1944 ships
World War II auxiliary ships of the United States
Camano-class cargo ships
United States Department of the Interior